Pratiggya is a 1975 Indian Hindi-language action comedy film. Produced by Dharmendra and B. S. Deol, the film is directed by Dulal Guha. The music was by Laxmikant-Pyarelal and the lyricist was Anand Bakshi. It stars Dharmendra, Hema Malini, Ajit, Johnny Walker, Jagdeep, Mukri, Mehar Mittal and Keshto Mukherjee.

The story revolves around Dharmendra out to avenge his parents' brutal murder by Ajit in this "violent revenge" story. Along with its strong action scenes it also had a significant comic track in the form of
"slapstick" comedy getting the film referred to as a "masterpiece in comedy". The film was a big commercial success at the box-office and among the top 3 grossers for the year in India.

Plot 
Ajit Singh (Dharmendra), an illiterate truck driver, learns from his dying adoptive mother, that he is the only surviving son of an honest cop who was killed and his entire family obliterated by the dreaded dacoit Bharat Thakur (Ajit) and so, he swears revenge. On his way to Dinapur, the dacoit's hideout, he meets a grievously injured cop, Inspector D'Souza, (Satyen Kappu) who dies protecting his stash of ammunition from local dacoits. Inspector D'Souza was en route to the village of Dinapur to set up a police station with his men and the ammo, and he leaves the weapons at Ajit Singh's disposal before succumbing to his wounds. Ajit Singh uses this new found stash of machine guns and grenades to pose as a cop and sets up a police station in the aforementioned village with the help of the villagers. His love interest is the feisty and pretty village belle Radha (Hema Malini), who is the niece of dreaded dacoit Bharat Thakur but hates his ways and supports Ajit Singh. Bharat Thakur himself is a cunning man and he sets up his man, the village drunkard Chandi (Keshto Mukherjee) as a spy within the village police station nexus. The rest of the film follows the struggle between Ajit Singh and Bharat and how he goes about taking his revenge and thus fulfilling his Pratigya (Promise).

Cast 
 Dharmendra as Inspector Devendra Singh / Ajit Singh / Thanedaar Indrajeet Singh (Double Role)
 Hema Malini as Radha Thakur
 Ajit as Bharat Daku
 Johnny Walker as Birju Thekedaar
 Jagdeep as Kanha
 Pradeep Kumar as Habibullah
 Abhi Bhattacharya as Inspector Abhijeet Singh
 Nazir Hussain as Sipahi Shivcharan
 Keshto Mukherjee as Chandi
 Sapru as Purohit
 Satyen Kappu as Inspector D'Souza
 Kanwar Ajit Singh Deol as Truck driver 
 Rammohan Sharma as Bhiku
 Mehar Mittal as Dinapur Resident
 Sunder as Barber Dinapur Resident
  D. K. Sapru as Purohit
  Imtiaz Khan as Raghu, Bharat Thakur's Brother
   Brahamchari as Sidhu
 Leela Mishra as Ajit's foster mother
 Urmila Bhatt as Mrs. D. Singh
 Birbal as Dinapur Resident
  Ramayan Tiwari as Shambhu Prasad
  Bhushan Tiwari as Daaku
Moolchand as Ajit Passenger

Music 
The music direction was by Laxmikant-Pyarelal with lyrics written by Anand Bakshi. The playback singing was by Lata Mangeshkar and Mohammed Rafi. The song "Main Jat Yamla Pagla Deewana" became a popular song remaining so till date.  The song's opening line was used as a title for Dharmendra's home production starring him and his two sons, Sunny Deol and Bobby Deol first in 2011, then in 2013, and then in 2018.

Song list

References

External links 
 

1975 films
1970s Hindi-language films
Indian action comedy films
Indian films about revenge
Films directed by Dulal Guha
1970s action comedy films